Lauren Gardner (nee McFall) (born February 9, 1980) represented America in synchronized swimming at the 2004 Summer Olympics in Athens, Greece. She was the team captain and won a bronze medal in the team competition.

Early life 
Gardner was born in Sacramento, California. She attended Los Altos High School then Columbia University in New York, School of General Studies.  She studied from 2005 to 2008 and was awarded a BA with majors in political science and international relations.

Work 
Gardner has worked for a number of companies in the area of electronic trading systems specifically for fixed income and derivatives. Since December 2015 has held the position of Head of Business Development for EBS/BrokerTec- an electronic execution venue for Foreign Exchange and US Treasuries.

Volunteer work 
She is a supporter of Asphalt Green and The Big Swim since 2002.

Olympic Day 2016 for children 5-12 where former Olympians  explain how the ideals of the Olympics have helped shape their lives.

Personal life 
She is married to Gabriel Gardner, gold medalist in men's indoor volleyball from the 2008 Beijing Olympics. They have four children, two from Gabriel's previous marriage, and live in California.

References

External links

1980 births
Living people
Sportspeople from California
Olympic bronze medalists for the United States in synchronized swimming
American synchronized swimmers
Synchronized swimmers at the 2004 Summer Olympics
Medalists at the 2004 Summer Olympics
Columbia University School of General Studies alumni